Trịnh Duy Long (born 22 January 1992) is a Vietnamese footballer who plays as a forward.

Honours
Sài Gòn
V.League 2: 2015

Individual
V.League 2 Top Goalscorers: 2015

References

1992 births
Living people
Vietnamese footballers
Association football forwards
V.League 1 players
Hanoi FC players
Saigon FC players
Quang Nam FC players